Manasseh Bailey (born June 27, 1997) is an American football wide receiver for the Winnipeg Blue Bombers. He played college football at Morgan State. He has been a member of the Philadelphia Eagles, Los Angeles Chargers, and New York Jets of the National Football League (NFL); Montreal Alouettes of the Canadian Football League (CFL); the DC Defenders of the XFL and Birmingham Stallions of the United States Football League (USFL).

Profesional career

Philadelphia Eagles
Bailey signed with the Philadelphia Eagles as an undrafted free agent following the 2020 NFL Draft on April 26, 2020. He was waived during final roster cuts on September 3, 2020,

Los Angeles Chargers
On December 9, 2020, Bailey was signed to the Los Angeles Chargers' practice squad. On December 12, 2020, Bailey was released from the Los Angeles Chargers.

New York Jets
On January 13, 2021, Bailey signed a future contract with the New York Jets.

Montreal Alouettes
On October 9, 2021, Bailey signed with the Montreal Alouettes and was put on the Practice Squad on October 26, 2021.

Birmingham Stallions
Bailey was selected in the 17th round of the 2022 USFL Draft by the Birmingham Stallions. He was released on April 22, 2022.

DC Defenders
Bailey was selected by the DC Defenders in the 2023 XFL Draft.

References

Living people
1997 births
American football wide receivers
Morgan State Bears football players
Philadelphia Eagles players
Los Angeles Chargers players
New York Jets players
Montreal Alouettes players
Birmingham Stallions (2022) players
DC Defenders players